Clinidium canaliculatum is a species of ground beetle in the subfamily Rhysodinae. It was described by O.G. Costa in 1839. It is found in southern Italy (including Sicily) and in Greece and is an obligate saproxylic species associated with old-growth forests, with preference to wet biotopes with well-decayed wood. Clinidium canaliculatum measure  in length.

References

Clinidium
Beetles of Europe
Beetles described in 1839
Taxa named by Oronzio Gabriele Costa